Major Series Lacrosse (MSL) is a Senior A box lacrosse league based in Ontario, Canada sanctioned by the Ontario Lacrosse Association.  Most of the star players in the league play or have played in the National Lacrosse League. Each year, the playoff teams battle for the right to compete against the Western Lacrosse Association champion for the Mann Cup every September. The championship is hosted alternately between Ontario and British Columbia every year.

History

Field Era
Major Series Lacrosse originated in the late 19th century as the Canadian Lacrosse Association.  In its early days, it had competition from the semi-professional National Lacrosse Union that ran from around 1880 until around 1920 with teams in the Toronto, Ottawa, and Montreal markets.  In the early 20th century the CLA had another rival league, the Dominion Lacrosse Association in much of the same markets as the NLU.  In these early days, all lacrosse was field lacrosse.  Early powerhouses in the league were the Orangeville Dufferins (1890s) and the St. Catharines Athletics (1900s and 1910s).

In 1913, the CLA became the Ontario Amateur Lacrosse Association.  The league had a Western Division with teams in Toronto and the Golden Horseshoe and an Eastern Division with teams in the Ottawa District, but a year later the Ottawa teams left the league.  In 1920, the NLU had dropped to 3 teams and elected to disband.  The OALA was left as the only Senior A league in Ontario and only had to face the Ontario Intermediate A champion for a berth into the Mann Cup National Senior championships.

In 1926, an OALA team won its first Mann Cup.  Until this point, the Mann Cup was a challenge trophy, mostly dominated by British Columbia's New Westminster Salmonbellies, in 1926 the entire country could compete for the trophy in a playdown style.  As standings leaders of the OALA at midpoint, the Weston Westonmen were awarded the right to represent the OALA for the Mann Cup.  The Westonmen were met by the Winnipeg Tigers, whom they defeated 11-3 to become the first Mann Cup champion of the playdown era.  The Westonmen were then forced to face the Brampton Excelsiors in the Ontario final who beat them 10-goals-to-6 in a two-game series.  The Westonmen would dominate the Ontario scene in the 1920s with 5 league titles and the 1926 Mann Cup.  In 1931, the Excelsiors defeated the Toronto Native Sons 2-games-to-1 to win the OALA championship.  The Excelsiors would go on to defeat New Westminster in the Mann Cup final 2-games-to-1.  This marked the end of Field Lacrosse for this league and the last Mann Cup to ever be conducted on a field.

Indoor Era
The Mimico Mountaineers would defeat the Fergus Thistles 2-games-to-1 to become the first Ontario Senior A box lacrosse champions.  They would later host the Winnipeg Argos at Maple Leaf Gardens and win the first ever indoor Mann Cup 2-games-to-none.

The Orillia Terriers would be the most dominant OALA team in the 1930s, winning four straight OALA title (1934-1937) and three consecutive Mann Cup (1934-1936) becoming the first team of the Indoor Era to accomplish that streak.

In 1939, the league became the Ontario Lacrosse Association Senior A League (OLA).

The St. Catharines Athletics found their stride in 1938 and would win the OLA seven times in nine seasons (losing 1942 and 1943 to Brampton).  The Athletics would be National Champions five times in that span, beating the New Westminster Adanacs 3-games-to-none in 1938, the Vancouver Burrards 3-games-to-1 in 1940, the Richmond Farmers 3-games-to-2 in 1941, the New Westminster Salmonbellies 3-games-to-2 in 1944 and the 'Bellies again in 1946 3-games-to-none.

In 1951, the core of the 1950 Mann Cup winning Owen Sound Crescents, including star goalie Lloyd "Moon" Wootton transferred to the Peterborough Trailermen.  The move would lead to one of the biggest dynasties ever in lacrosse, including 8 OLA championships in 9 years, 4 Mann Cups, and an infamous standoff with the Canadian Lacrosse Association that left the entire team suspended for five years.  From 1951 until 1957, the Trailermen won 7 straight OLA League titles and the first four years they won the Mann Cup, becoming the first indoor team to win four years straight.  In 1951, the Trailermen defeated the Vancouver Combines 4-games-to-3 to win their first Mann Cup, then beat Vancouver (Burrards) again in 1952 4-games-to-none to win it again.  In 1953 and 1954, the Trailermen defeated the Victoria Shamrocks 4-games-to-1 and 4-games-straight respectively to cap off the four cup run.  Victoria would return the favour in 1955, beating the Trailermen in 5 games, and the Nanaimo Timbermen would do the same in 1956.  The Trailermen would win their league again in 1957, but controversy ensued at the Mann Cup.  Peterborough's star scorer Bob Allan left a BC team without receiving a release to come play for the Trailermen.  Although the OLA ruled him eligible, when the team arrived in BC to play the Mann Cup, the CLA barred him from playing.  Peterborough refused to take the floor for the first game without Allan and the CLA kicked them out of the playoffs and suspended every player on the team for five seasons.  The Trailermen were replaced by a rusty Long Branch Pontiacs squad that were easily swept by Victoria.  The Trailermen players sat out their suspension in 1958, but their suspensions were commuted in time for the 1959 season.  Peterborough would win yet another league title in 1959, but could not muster any past success in the Mann Cup final.  The dynasty had ended and Peterborough did not make another final for six seasons.

Teams

All-Star Game
During the 2012 MSL Entry Draft, the league announced it would be holding its first ever All-Star Game. Peterborough was set to host, citing average attendance as the driving factor. However, in April that same year, the game was cancelled due to two major issues. The first was concern of unnecessary risk of injury and the other was the distribution of revenue.

Champions

Defunct teams
Aurora Astros
Akwesasne Thunder
Barrie Lakeshores
Brantford Warriors
Buffalo Gamblers
Fergus Thistles
Hastings Legionnaires
Huntsville Hawks
Kitchener-Waterloo Kodiaks
Mississauga Renegades
Mississauga Braves
Niagara Falls Gamblers
Orangeville Northmen
Oshweken Wolves 
Owen Sound North Stars
Sarnia Lumley Wrecking
Scarborough Saints
St. Catharines Athletics
St. Regis Indians
Toronto Shooting Stars 
Toronto Maple Leafs
Windsor Warlocks

See also
Box lacrosse
Western Lacrosse Association

References

External links
Major Series Lacrosse
OLA Official Website

Ontario Lacrosse Association
Lacrosse leagues in Canada
Sports leagues established in 1887
1887 establishments in Ontario